Embiidae is a family of webspinners in the order Embioptera. There are more than 20 genera and 80 described species in Embiidae.

Genera
These 23 genera belong to the family Embiidae:

 Acrosembia Ross, 2006
 Apterembia Ross, 1957
 Arabembia Ross, 1981
 Berlandembia Davis, 1940
 Chirembia Davis, 1940
 Cleomia Stefani, 1953
 Dihybocercus Enderlein, 1912
 Dinembia Davis, 1939
 Donaconethis Enderlein, 1909
 Embia Latreille, 1829
 Enveja Navás, 1916
 Leptembia Krauss, 1911
 Machadoembia Ross, 1952
 Macrembia Davis, 1940
 Metembia Davis, 1939
 Odontembia Davis, 1939
 Oedembia Ross, 2007
 Parachirembia Davis, 1940
 Parembia Davis, 1939
 Parthenembia Ross, 1960
 Pseudembia Davis, 1939
 † Electroembia Ross, 1956
 † Lithembia Ross, 1984

References

Further reading

 
 
 
 

Embioptera
Insect families